Deh-e Leyli (also romanized as Deh-e Leylī) is a village in Quri Qaleh Rural District, Shahu District, Ravansar County, Kermanshah Province, Iran. At the 2006 census, its population was 453, in 88 families.

References 

Populated places in Ravansar County